Sainamaina Municipality, also known as Dudharakchhe, is one of the new 72 municipalities formed in Nepal. It is located in Rupandehi District in Lumbini Province of southern Nepal. The Municipality was established on 18 May 2014 merging two existing VDCs i.e. Dudharakchhe and Parroha. At the time of the 2011 Nepal census it had a population of 48,178 people. Official website of Sainamaina Municipality is https://sainamainamun.gov.np/.

References

Populated places in Rupandehi District
Municipalities in Lumbini Province
Nepal municipalities established in 2014